Pablo Fernández may refer to:
Pablo Fernández (baseball) (1901–?), Cuban baseball player
Pablo Fernández Santos (born 1976), Spanish politician
Pablo Fernández (footballer) (born 1996), Spanish footballer

See also
Blin (footballer) (born 1979), Spanish footballer born Pablo Fernández Antuña
Pablo Ferrández (born 1991), Spanish cellist
 Pablo Armando Fernández (born 1930), Cuban poet
Pablo Hernández (disambiguation)